PAX Technology is a Chinese manufacturer of payment terminals, PIN pads, and point of sale hardware and software. The company is headquartered in Shenzhen, listed on the Hong Kong Stock Exchange and sells its products globally.

History
PAX Technology was founded in Shenzhen (China) in 2000. Jack Lu and Tiger Nie are currently Group CEO and chairman of the Board respectively.

In 2002, PAX was selected as supplier of EFTPOS terminals for China UnionPay Merchant Services and supplier for Bank of China & Bank of Communications in 2004. In 2010, PAX was listed on the Hong Kong Stock Exchange.

In 2013, PAX was listed in Forbes Asia 200 Best Under A Billion Companies. In 2016, PAX announced a strategic partnership with Samsung to implement the Samsung Pay payment method in PAX payment terminals. Later same year, PAX unveiled its first Android smart terminal.

Cybersecurity concerns 
In October 2021, Worldpay, Inc., a subsidiary of FIS, began removing PAX point of sale products due to cybersecurity concerns.

Federal raid of U.S. offices 
On October 26, 2021, it was reported that agents from the U.S. Federal Bureau of Investigation, Department of Homeland Security, and other federal officials raided the Jacksonville, Florida offices of PAX Technology. KrebsOnSecurity reported the raid was tied to reports that PAX's systems may have been involved in cyberattacks on U.S. and E.U. organizations. Following the raid, a senior executive in charge of PAX Technology's security resigned.

See also
 Point of sale companies

References

External links 

 

Technology companies of China
Retail point of sale systems
Point of sale companies
Companies based in Jacksonville, Florida